The Iowa State Cyclones women's swimming and diving team represents Iowa State University (ISU) and competes in the Big 12 Conference of NCAA Division I. The team is coached by Duane Sorenson, who has led Iowa State since the 1997-98 season.  The Cyclones host their home meets at Beyer Pool on Iowa State's campus.

History

Iowa State first had club swim teams dating back to the 1920s but first put together a varsity squad for the 1970–71 year.  They were able to capture their first Big Eight Title in 1974 under coach Deidre Singleton.

Head Coach Ramsey Van Horn was hired in 1979 to lead the Cyclones.  Iowa State experienced a considerable amount of individual success under Ramsey including 15 All-Americans and 21 Conference Champions.  Ramsey was let go in 1997.

Duane Sorenson has been the head coach since the 1997-98 season.  He is assisted by Jeff Warrick who is a diving specialist.

Record

Individual Accomplishments

Swimming Conference Champions

Diving Conference Champions

All-Americans

Facilities

Beyer Hall Pool is the site of Cyclone home swimming meets. The facility houses a six-lane, T-shaped, 25-yard competitive pool with an attached diving well. The pool has permanent spectator seating for approximately 800 people.  The competitive pool has a variable depth bottom and turbulence reducing gutters. Beyer pool is also equipped with a Colorado electronic timing system and a seven-line scoreboard display. Underwater viewing windows aid the coaching staff with stroke correction and videotape stroke analysis.

Beyer’s diving well has two 1-meter diving boards, two 3-meter diving boards and a 5-meter platform. The 5-meter platform and 1-meter diving boards are on concrete stands. The 3-meter boards are on Durafirm stands and all diving boards are Maxiflex model “B” springboards. Next to the diving well are a trampoline and a dry-board that is fully equipped with a spotting rig designed to help divers learn and perfect somersaulting and twisting dives. The pool also has two TIVO video systems that capture dives off each board and platform allowing divers to quickly view the dive they just performed.

Beyer has been the home of the 1962 and 1971 NCAA meets as well as numerous conference championships.

References

Women's